Ariadnaria is a genus of small sea snails, marine gastropod mollusks in the family Capulidae, the cap snails.

Species
Species within the genus Ariadnaria include:

 Ariadnaria acutiminata (Golikov & Gulbin, 1978)
 Ariadnaria alexandrae Egorov & Alexeyev, 1998
 Ariadnaria borealis (Broderip & G. B. Sowerby I, 1829)
 Ariadnaria densecostata Golikov, 1986
 Ariadnaria hirsuta (Golikov & Gulbin, 1978)
 Ariadnaria insignis (Middendorff, 1848)

References

External links

Capulidae
Monotypic gastropod genera